Sunita was a highly accomplished disciple of the Buddha. Sunitha or Sunita may also refer to:

Arts and entertainment 
Sunita (novel), Magahi-language novel by Jaynath Pati

People with the forename
 Sunitha (actress), a South Indian actress, also known as Kodai Mazhai Vidhya, who acted in Malayalam, Tamil, Kannada language films during the 1990s
 Sunitha Krishnan (born 1972), an Indian social activist and co-founder of Prajwala
 Sunitha Rao, a former American professional tennis player
 Sunitha Sarathy, a playback singer, vocalist and performer of Indian and Western musical genres
 Sunitha Upadrashta, Indian playback singer, anchor and dubbing artist in Cinema of Andhra Pradesh|Tollywood
 Sunitha Varma, a South Indian actress who has performed in Telugu, Tamil, Kannada and Malayalam language films
 Sunitha Wickramasinghe,  a Professor of Haematology,  the former Deputy Dean of the Imperial College School of Medicine
 Sunita Williams (born 1965),  a United States Naval officer and a NASA astronaut
 Sunita Narain, Indian environmentalist and director of the Centre for Science and Environment
 Sunita Mani, Indian-American actress, dancer, and comedian

People with the surname
 Paritala Sunitha,  a member of the Legislative Assembly of the Indian state of Andhra Pradesh

See also

Sinitta